Puhakka is a Finnish surname. Notable people with the surname include:

 Antti Puhakka (1816–1893), Finnish romantic poet
 Joona Puhakka (born 1982), Finnish diver
 Mirja Puhakka (fl. 1980–1984), Finnish ski-orienteering competitor
 Olli Puhakka (1916–1989), Finnish Air Force ace
 Osmo Puhakka (born 1948), Finnish Lutheran clergyman and politician

Finnish-language surnames